The Einbecker Brewery (German: Einbecker Brauhaus) is a brewery located in Einbeck, Germany. Founded before 1378, it is one of the oldest still operating breweries in the world. The city of Einbeck is noted for its bock beer, and Einbecker, the only remaining brewery in town, makes multiple varieties thereof.

History
The region of Lower Saxony and the town of Einbeck in particular dominated the European beer market during the fourteenth century, when the Hanseatic League helped distribute Einbeck's bock beer throughout Northern Europe. The Einbecker Brewery is the only remaining brewery from that tradition, and was already in operation in 1378: the first city record in Einbeck that mentions beer dates from 28 April 1378, and refers to the sale of two casks of beer ("Einbecker") to the town of Celle, some 80 miles away. The brewery claims the tradition with a legend above the door, Ohne Einbeck gäb's kein Bockbier ("Without Einbeck there would be no bock"). Notable drinkers of Einbecker include, reportedly, Martin Luther, who was given a cask of it before the 1521 trial where he was to be excommunicated, and supposedly praised it in a two-line doggerel verse. Luther was also gifted a barrel of Einbecker in June 1525 by the city of Wittenberg on the occasion of his marriage to Katherine von Bora. 
Einbeck’s dominance lasted until the Thirty Years' War.

Brewing rights in Einbeck were owned by the city, and brewing operations were consolidated in 1794 in a publicly owned city brewery, from then on the sole brewery in the city. Its beer was first bottled in 1884, in the "distinctive low-shouldered bottle" that the company still uses.

The brewery, which had taken over two other regional breweries (Göttinger Brauhaus and Kassel's Martini Brauerei, in 1988 and 1997), merged into the brewing consortium Brau und Brunnen.  Einbecker produced 850,000 hectoliters per year and employed 200 people.

Products

Einbecker Brewery produces three "original" bocks, but its best-selling beer is a pilsner, Brauherren Pils. Like the Czech beer Pilsner Urquell, Einbecker is considered "original" enough to warrant the designation Ur, or "original," which it carries in all of its bocks.
In 2018, the brewery offers five bocks (two seasonal) and eight other kinds (inc. one seasonal).

Bock
round the year:
Ur-Bock-Hell, a golden bock, 6.5%
Ur-Bock-Dunkel, a dark bock, 6.5%
Ainpöckisch Bier 1378, an unfiltered bock, 6.7%. - This is an attempted recreation of the 14th century hit, promoted as "Martin Luthers most beloved beer".

seasonal:
Mai-Ur-Bock, a Maibock, 6.5% (available in May only)
Winter-Bock, a doppelbock, 7.5% and the strongest they brew (available November/December only)

Pilsner
Brauherren Pils, 4.8% (also in a non*-alcohol version. *Means less than 0.5%)
Premium Pils, 4.9%

Other
Dunkel, a dark malty lager, 5.3%.
Landbier Spezial, an amber lager with noted hops, 5.2%
Weihnachtsbier, an amber lager, 5.3%. This X-mas beer is available in December only.
Kellerbier, an amber lager, unfiltered, 4.8%.
Radler, the Brauherren Pils above mixed with citrus juices, 2.5%.

References
Notes

Bibliography

External links

External links

 

1378 establishments in Europe
1370s establishments in the Holy Roman Empire
Breweries in Germany
Beer brands of Germany
Companies based in Lower Saxony
Einbeck